Betaworks is an American startup studio and seed stage venture capital company based in New York City that invests in network-focused, consumer-facing media businesses.

Its hybrid investor/builder model has led to both investments in fast-growing startups like Tumblr, Airbnb, Groupon and Twitter as well as more exclusive stakes in internally built startups such as Chartbeat, Bitly and SocialFlow. Betaworks was founded in 2007 by John Borthwick.

It has also recently come into the limelight a little more with The Intern podcast, hosted and produced by Allison Behringer. The podcast recounts a young woman beginning her career in the world of technology.

In 2016, Betaworks sold its Instapaper product to the social media scrapbooking site, Pinterest.

Studio

Current: 
 Giphy lets anyone search for animated gifs on the web. It was born out of an experiment by two hackers in residence, Alex Chung and Jace Cooke, who found it difficult to browse the best gifs on the web. It spread unexpectedly quickly, serving millions of results in the first few weeks. "We could tell it struck a nerve, so we swarmed it," said Paul Murphy, the head of product at Betaworks told The Verge 
 Activate (app) helps people discover and follow their favorite blogs. The site was founded in Sweden and has over 2 million members, 70% of them who follow fashion blogs & over 90% who are female. Shortly after it took $1 million of investment from Betaworks and Lerer Hippeau Ventures in 2012, traffic spiked following Google's announcement to discontinue Google Reader.
 In July 2012, the company acquired the Digg brand and internet assets for US$500,000 and merged it with News.me, a social news reading app.
 In April 2013, the company released Dots, a video game downloaded over 10 million times.

Former:  
 Chartbeat, which provides realtime analytics to websites and blogs. It shows visitors, load times, and referring.
 Bitly, which that allows users to shorten, share, and track links (URLs). Reducing the URL length makes sharing easier.
 SocialFlow, which optimizes the real-time value of content.
 In April 2013, the company acquired a majority stake in Instapaper, before selling it to Pinterest in 2016.

References

Business incubators of the United States
Venture capital firms of the United States
Privately held companies based in New York City
Financial services companies established in 2007